Fahadh Fazil is an Indian actor and film producer who predominantly works in Malayalam cinema and has appeared in few Tamil and Telugu films. 

Fahadh began his film career at the age of 19 by starring in the leading role in his father Fazil's 2002 romantic film Kaiyethum Doorath, which was a critical and commercial failure. After a gap of 7 years, Fahadh made his comeback with the anthology film Kerala Cafe (2009), in the short film Mrityunjayam. He attained public attention for his role as Arjun in the thriller film Chaappa Kurishu (2011). Fahadh won his first Kerala State Film Award, the Best Supporting Actor Award for his performance in Chaappa Kurishu along with his performance in Akam. He achieved critical acclaim and recognition for his roles as Cyril in 22 Female Kottayam (2012) and Dr. Arun Kumar in Diamond Necklace (2012). He won his first Filmfare Award for Best Actor, for his role in 22 Female Kottayam.

As actor 

All films are in Malayalam language unless otherwise noted.

As a producer

Other appearances

References 

Indian filmographies